"The Cheever Letters" is the 48th episode of the American sitcom Seinfeld, the eighth episode of season four. It was written by Larry David, Elaine Pope, and Tom Leopold, and directed by Tom Cherones. It premiered on October 28, 1992. In this episode, George and Susan break the news about the cabin burning down to Susan's parents, but the tension over this revelation is soon eclipsed by the content of letters from John Cheever found in the ruins of the cabin. Meanwhile, Jerry dates Elaine's secretary and inadvertently offends her during their dirty talk.

Plot
Jerry and George struggle with their sitcom pilot script. Jerry telephones Elaine and complains to her about her chatty secretary, Sandra. Elaine asks Sandra not to talk to Jerry so much. Hurt, Sandra quits. At Jerry's apartment, Kramer wants George to ask Susan's father for more Cuban cigars to bribe his way onto the Westchester Country Club golf course.

That night, George has an awkward dinner with Susan and her parents. Susan and George tell her father about the loss of the cabin, and he is devastated.

At Elaine's request, Jerry calls Sandra and retracts his comments about her by claiming they were misconstrued by Elaine. This prompts Sandra to ask him out; Jerry accepts for fear of offending her again. They return to his apartment, but while talking dirty to each other, Sandra takes offense to one of Jerry's remarks and storms off. George and Jerry continue to struggle writing the script and then doze off after failing to write any more. Elaine thanks Jerry for getting Sandra back to work, but Jerry says she should relocate her quickly and is relieved that Sandra did not mention the previous night.

Kramer goes to the Cuban Permanent Mission at the United Nations to ask some diplomats about buying Cuban cigars. Although told they're illegal in the US, the chief diplomat takes a liking to Kramer's jacket, and agrees to trade it for some cigars. Kramer befriends the diplomats and, as thanks, invites them to golf.

Jerry and George go to Susan's house to return her sunglasses. A doorman delivers a metal box from the insurance company, the only object which survived the cabin fire. Inside are letters detailing an affair between Susan's father and novelist John Cheever. Susan's father openly admits to the affair. Jerry and George awkwardly slip out.

They again fail to progress with the script before they are interrupted by Elaine, who is angry with Jerry because her company charged her $429 for making long-distance phone calls to Europe from work. After Elaine had Sandra transferred to another office, Sandra turned her in. Jerry gladly gives Elaine the money, still relieved that Sandra had not told Elaine about his earlier "dirty talk" comment. As she's walking out the door, she repeats Jerry's remark to Sandra, revealing that she knew about it all along.

References

External links 
 

Seinfeld (season 4) episodes
1992 American television episodes
Television episodes written by Larry David
American LGBT-related television episodes